Ibra Charles Blackwood (November 21, 1878February 12, 1936) was the 97th Governor of South Carolina from 1931 to 1935.

Biography
Born in rural Spartanburg County, South Carolina, Blackwood studied at Furman University preparatory school and obtained his law degree from Wofford College. During this time he became a brother of Pi Kappa Alpha. He then began to practice law in Spartanburg.

At the age of 24, Blackwood was elected to the South Carolina House of Representatives in 1902. From 1914 to 1916, Blackwood served as a tax collector for the Internal Revenue Service after which he became the solicitor for the Seventh Judicial Circuit of South Carolina. Blackwood won a contested Democratic primary in 1930 to become the 97th governor of South Carolina. His term as governor was noted for the creation of the South Carolina Public Service Authority in 1934 which provided for a hydroelectric plant at Pinopolis Dam and the construction of numerous dams on the Santee and Cooper Rivers. A major strike in 1934 by the majority of textile workers in the state forced Governor Blackwood to call up the South Carolina National Guard. However, the strike was so severe that the Governor had to commission "constables without compensation" and 6 strikers were killed by these special deputies in Honea Path on September 6.

Blackwood resumed the practice of law in Spartanburg upon leaving the governorship in 1935. He died almost a year later on February 12, 1936, and is buried in Greenlawn Memorial Gardens.

References 

1878 births
1936 deaths
Wofford College alumni
South Carolina lawyers
Democratic Party members of the South Carolina House of Representatives
Democratic Party governors of South Carolina
University of South Carolina trustees
South Carolina state solicitors
People from Spartanburg County, South Carolina